Lam Tsuen may refer to:

 Lam Tsuen, an area in Tai Po District, Hong Kong
 Lam Tsuen River, a river in Tai Po District, Hong Kong
 Lam Tsuen San Tsuen, a village in Lam Tsuen, Tai Po District, Hong Kong
 Lam Tsuen Valley, valley in the New Territories, Hong Kong